In enzymology, an alpha-1,3-glucan synthase is an enzyme that catalyzes the chemical reaction

UDP-glucose + [alpha-D-glucosyl-(1-3)]n  UDP + [alpha-D-glucosyl-(1-3)]n+1

Thus, the two substrates of this enzyme are UDP-glucose and [[[alpha-D-glucosyl-(1-3)]n]], whereas its two products are UDP and [[[alpha-D-glucosyl-(1-3)]n+1]].

This enzyme belongs to the family of glycosyltransferases, specifically the hexosyltransferases.  The systematic name of this enzyme class is UDP-glucose:alpha-D-(1-3)-glucan 3-alpha-D-glucosyltransferase. Other names in common use include uridine diphosphoglucose-1,3-alpha-glucan glucosyltransferase, and 1,3-alpha-D-glucan synthase.

References

 

EC 2.4.1
Enzymes of unknown structure